Randolph Oswald George (died 18 July 2016) was the Bishop of Guyana from 1980 until 2009. Born in 1924 and educated at Codrington College, Barbados, after a curacy at St Peter Barbados he spent a decade in England. Successively he was Curate at Leigh, Ardwick and Lavender Hill  before returning to become Chaplain to the Bishop of Trinidad. From there he became Rector of Couva then All Saints, Port of Spain before being elected to the Deanery of the Anglican Diocese of Guyana in 1971. Promoted to be the Suffragan Bishop of Stabroek in 1976, four years later he became Bishop -a position he held until 2009.

George died on 18 July 2016 at the age of 92.

References

1924 births
2016 deaths
Alumni of Codrington College
Deans of St George's Cathedral, Georgetown
Suffragan Bishops of Stabroek
Anglican bishops of Guyana
20th-century Anglican bishops in the Caribbean
21st-century Anglican bishops in the Caribbean
Guyanese expatriates in Barbados
Guyanese expatriates in Trinidad and Tobago
Guyanese expatriates in the United Kingdom